Suttner may refer to:

12799 von Suttner, an asteroid
Andreas Suttner (1876–1953), Austrian fencer
Bertha von Suttner (1843–1914), Austrian novelist and pacifist
Kurt Suttner (born 1936), German choral conductor
Markus Suttner, Austrian footballer
Raymond Suttner

See also
Sutter (disambiguation)